Christian is a 1989 Danish drama film directed by Gabriel Axel. It was entered into the main competition at the 46th Venice International Film Festival.

Cast
Nikolaj Christensen as Christian
Nathalie Brusse as Aïcha
Preben Lerdorff Rye as The Grandfather
 as Johnny
Else Petersen

References

External links

 

1989 films
Danish drama films
1989 crime drama films
Films directed by Gabriel Axel